Diuris, commonly known as donkey orchids, bee orchids, nanny goat orchids or pansy orchids, is a genus of more than sixty species of flowering plants in the orchid family, Orchidaceae and is endemic to Australia, apart from one species endemic to Timor. The name "Diuris" refers to the hanging sepals but the common name "donkey orchid", derives from the ear-like petals common to all species. Many have mainly yellow flowers with darker markings and are thought to mimic nectar-producing flowers which open at the same time.

Description
Orchids in the genus Diuris are terrestrial, perennial, deciduous, sympodial herbs, usually with a few inconspicuous, fine roots and one or two tubers lacking a protective sheath. The stem is short, erect and unbranched with a leaf-like cataphyll at each node. There are between one and ten grass-like leaves at the base of the plant.

The inflorescence is a raceme with a few to many brightly coloured, resupinate flowers on a wiry stalk. The dorsal sepal is shorter but wider than two lateral sepals and forms a hood over the column. The long, narrow, lateral sepals hang like a pair of tails below the labellum. The petals are different from the sepals, having a narrow base with the main part widely expanded, in the form of donkey ears. As is usual in orchids, one petal is highly modified as the central labellum, differing markedly from the other petals and sepals. The labellum has three distinct parts with the central part folded and the lateral parts arranged on either side of the column, often spreading widely, sometimes with a scalloped or wavy edge. The column is short with narrow wings. Flowering time depends on species but most species flower between September and November. One of the earliest to flower, D. brumalis flowers in June and D. emarginata sometimes flowers as late as January. The fruit which follows flowering is a thin-walled, dehiscent capsule containing up to 100 winged seeds.

Taxonomy and naming
The genus Diuris was first formally described in 1798 by James Edward Smith and the description was published in Transactions of the Linnean Society of London. Smith did not nominate a type species.

The common name "donkey orchid" refers to the ear-like petals. The scientific name is derived from the Greek dis meaning 'double' and oura, 'tail', referring to the two narrow lateral sepals.

Distribution and habitat
Donkey orchids occur in all Australian states, but not the Northern Territory with one species (D. fryana) found in Timor. In New South Wales, most species grow among grasses in sclerophyll forest. In Western Australia, most grow in moist places such as coastal swamps or near granite outcrops. Some species flower more profusely after fire and D. purdiei will only flower following a summer fire. In fire-prone areas, the tubers lie dormant in the soil and are not harmed by bushfires.

Ecology
Donkey orchids are coloured like flowers that attract pollinating insects such as wasps, bees and flies but no Diuris produce nectar and very few have a scent. It is thought that Diuris species deceive insect by falsely advertising the presence of food and this hypothesis is supported by experiments on only one species, D. pardina.

Gallery

Species 
The following species are mostly those listed in the Index Kewensis. Australian authorities recognise two further species (marked *).

 Diuris abbreviata F.Muell. ex Benth 1873 (N.S.W., Qld.)
 Diuris aequalis F.Muell. ex Fitzg. 1876 (N.S.W.)
 Diuris alba R.Br. 1810 (N.S.W., Qld.)
 Diuris amplissima D.L.Jones 1991 (W.A.)
 Diuris arenaria D.L.Jones 1999 (N.S.W.)
 Diuris aurea Sm. 1804 (N.S.W., Qld.)
 Diuris basaltica D.L.Jones 2006 (Vic.)
 Diuris behrii Schltdl. 1847 (N.S.W., Vic., S.A.)
 Diuris brachyscapa D.L.Jones & C.J.French 2016 (W.A.)
 Diuris bracteata Fitzg. 1891 (N.S.W.)
 Diuris brevifolia R.S.Rogers 1922 (S.A.)
 Diuris brevis D.L.Jones & C.J.French 2016 (W.A.)
 Diuris brevissima Fitzg. ex Nicholls 1942 (N.S.W.)
 Diuris brumalis D.L.Jones 1991 (W.A.)
 Diuris byronensis D.L.Jones 2003 (N.S.W.)
 Diuris calcicola R.J.Bates 2015 (N.S.W.)
 Diuris callitrophila D.L.Jones 2003 (N.S.W.)
 Diuris carecta D.L.Jones & C.J.French 2016
 Diuris carinata Lindl 1840 : tall bee orchid (W.A.)
 Diuris chrysantha D.L.Jones & M.A.Clem. 1987 (N.S.W., Qld.)
 Diuris chryseopsis D.L.Jones 1998 : snake orchid (N.S.W., Vic., Tas. S.A.)
 Diuris concinna D.L.Jones 1991 (W.A.)
 Diuris conspicillata D.L.Jones 1991 (W.A.)
 Diuris corymbosa Lindl.  1840 (W.A., S.A., Vic., N.S.W.)
 Diuris cruenta D.L.Jones & C.J.French 2016 (W.A.)
 Diuris cuneata Fitzg. 1891 (N.S.W.)
 Diuris curta D.L.Jones 2006 (N.S.W., Qld.)
 Diuris curvifolia Lindl. 1840 (Tas.)
 Diuris decrementa D.L.Jones & C.J.French 2013 (W.A.) – common bee orchid
 Diuris dendrobioides Fitzg. 1882 (N.S.W.) *
 Diuris disposita D.L.Jones 1991 (N.S.W.)
 Diuris drummondii Lindl. 1840 : tall donkey orchid (W.A.)
 Diuris eborensis D.L.Jones 2006 (N.S.W.)
 Diuris eburnea D.L.Jones 2006 (W.A.)
 Diuris emarginata R.Br. 1810 : tall donkey orchid 
 Diuris emarginata var. emarginata (W.A.)
 Diuris emarginata var. pauciflora A.S.George 1971
 Diuris exitela D.L.Jones 1991 (Qld.)
 Diuris filifolia Lindl. 1840 : cat's face orchid (W.A.)
 Diuris flavescens D.L.Jones 1991 (N.S.W.)
 Diuris fragrantissima D.L.Jones & M.A.Clem. 1989 (Vic.)
 Diuris fryana Ridl. in H.O.Forbes 1885 (Timor)
 Diuris fucosa D.L.Jomes 2006 (N.S.W., Vic.)
 Diuris gregaria D.L.Jones 2006 (Vic.)
 Diuris hazeliae D.L.Jones 2013 (W.A.)
 Diuris heberlei D.L.Jones 1991 (W.A.)
 Diuris immaculata D.L.Jones 2006 (W.A.)
 Diuris insignis D.L.Jones & C.J.French 2013 (W.A.)
 Diuris jonesii C.J.French & G.Brockman 2013 (W.A.)
 Diuris laevis Fitzg.  1882 : nannygoat orchid (W.A.)
 Diuris lanceolata Lindl. 1840 (N.S.W., Vic., S.A., Tas.)
 Diuris laxiflora  Lindl.  1840 : bee  orchid (W.A.)
 Diuris littoralis  D.L.Jones & C.J.French 2016
 Diuris longifolia  R.Br. 1810 : purple pansy orchid or common donkey orchid (W.A.)
 Diuris luteola D.L.Jones & B.Gray 1991 (Qld.)
 Diuris maculata Sm. 1805 (Qld., N.S.W., Vic., S.A., Tas.)
 Diuris magnifica D.L.Jones 1991 (W.A.)
 Diuris micrantha D.L.Jones 1991 (W.A.)
 Diuris monticola  D.L.Jones 1998 (N.S.W., Vic., Tas.)
 Diuris nigromontana D.L.Jones 2008 (A.C.T.)
 Diuris ochroma D.L.Jones 1994 (N.S.W., Vic.)
 Diuris oporina D.L.Jones 1991 (Qld.)
 Diuris oraria D.L.Jones & C.J.French 2016
 Diuris orientis D.L.Jones 1998 (N.S.W., S.A., Vic., Tas.)
 Diuris ostrina D.L.Jones & C.J.French 2016
 Diuris pallescens D.L.Jones & C.J.French 2016
 Diuris palustris Lindl. 1840 (S.A., Vic., Tas.)
 Diuris pardina Lindl. 1840 (N.S.W., S.A., Vic., Tas.)
 Diuris parvipetala (Dockrill) D.L.Jones & M.A.Clem. 1987 (N.S.W., Qld.)
 Diuris pedunculata R.Br. 1810 (N.S.W.)
 Diuris perialla D.L.Jones & C.J.French 2012 (W.A.)
 Diuris picta J.Drumm. 1853 (W.A.)
 Diuris platichila Fitzg. 1891 (N.S.W.)
 Diuris porphyrochila D.L.Jones & C.J.French 2016
 Diuris porrifolia Lindl. 1840 *
 Diuris praecox D.L.Jones 1991 (N.S.W.)
 Diuris protena D.L.Jones 2006 : northern golden moths (Vic.)
 Diuris pulchella D.L.Jones 1991 (W.A.)
 Diuris punctata Sm. 1804 : purple diuris (N.S.W., Qld., Vic.)
 Diuris punctata var. punctata
 Diuris punctata var. sulphurea Rupp 1944
 Diuris purdiei Diels  1903 : Purdie's donkey orchid (W.A.)
 Diuris recurva D.L.Jones  1991 (W.A.)
 Diuris refracta D.L.Jones & C.J.French 2013 (W.A.)
 Diuris secundiflora Fitzg. 1877 (N.S.W.)
 Diuris segregata D.L.Jones & C.J.French 2013 (W.A.)
 Diuris semilunulata Messmer in H.M.R.Rupp 1944 (N.S.W., A.C.T., Vic.)
 Diuris septentrionalis D.L.Jones & C.J.French 2013 (W.A.)
 Diuris setacea R.Br. 1910 : bristly donkey orchid (W.A.)
 Diuris striata Rupp 1944 (N.S.W.)
 Diuris subalpina D.L.Jones 2008 (N.S.W.)
 Diuris suffusa D.L.Jones & C.J.French 2016
 Diuris sulphurea R.Br. 1810 (N.S.W., Qld., S.A., Tas., Vic.)
 Diuris systena D.L.Jones & L.M.Copel. 2012 (N.S.W.)
 Diuris tinkeri D.L.Jones & C.J.French 2013 (W.A.)
 Diuris tricolor Fitzg. 1885 (N.S.W., Qld.)
 Diuris unica D.L.Jones 2006 (N.S.W., Qld.)
 Diuris venosa Rupp 1926 (N.S.W.)

Natural hybrids 
 Diuris × fastidiosa R.S.Rogers 1927 (D. lanceolata × D. palustris)
 Diuris × nebulosa D.L.Jones 1991 (D. aurea × D. punctata)
 Diuris × palachila R.S.Rogers 1907 (D. behrii × D. pardina)
 Diuris × polymorpha Messmer in H.M.R.Rupp 1944 (D. lanceolata × D. platichila)

References

External links 
 

 
Diurideae genera
Orchids of Australia
Flora of East Timor